King Mobon (30–53, r. 48–53) was the fifth king of Goguryeo, the northernmost of the Three Kingdoms of Korea.

Background and reign
According to the Samguk Sagi, a 12th-century Korean history of the Three Kingdoms, Mobon was the eldest son of Goguryeo's third king Daemusin. Although Mobon was the crown prince at the time of Daemusin's death, because of Mobon's youth, Daemusin's younger brother Minjung ascended to the throne.  Mobon became king upon Minjung's death. However, in the Samguk Yusa, Mobon is described as Minjung's older brother.

The Samguk Sagi notes that Mobon's character was fierce and stubborn and he incurred the resentment of the common people. In 49, he attacked the Beiping, Yuyang, Shanggu, and Taiyuan commanderies of Han Dynasty, several times, but later signed a treaty with Han.

He was killed by a court official named Duro, from Mobon. He was buried in Mobon-won.

He named his son Ik the crown prince, but upon Mobon's death, there was a power struggle for the throne.  Some scholars believe that Mobon was the last of the Hae surname line that began with Goguryeo's second king Yuri, and the sixth king Taejo began the Go surname lineage (then retroactively attributing the Go surname to the founding monarch Jumong).

Controversy surrounding later reign
Many of the main Korean sources, such as the Samguk Sagi and Samguk Yusa, state that King Mobon was a great king who thought for his people initially, but turned into a ruthless tyrant in the later part of his reign. However, in observing the events that are mentioned in the same Korean sources, such things as the opening of all food storages to relieve the people of their hunger and destitution and the expansion of territories are mentioned, which are not acts that are characteristic of a tyrant. With this in mind, some scholars suspect that the records and public image of King Mobon may have been an attempt by the supporters of Taejo of Goguryeo to justify their coup de'tat. These scholars further support the theory that the difference in last names in the early Goguryeo rulers is due to a shift in power among the Five Noble Families.

See also
History of Korea
Three Kingdoms of Korea
List of Korean monarchs

References

Goguryeo rulers
53 deaths
1st-century monarchs in Asia
30 births
1st-century Korean people